"Bleed" is the third single by heavy metal band Soulfly, released in 1998 from the self-titled album Soulfly. Limp Bizkit guest members Fred Durst and DJ Lethal sing this song about pain, lying and madness with lyrics written by Durst and Max Cavalera. This song tributes Cavalera for the untimely death of his stepson Dana.

"Bleed" was the first music video released by Soulfly. Scenes include a fight including strangling, guest singer Durst jumped, and driving with shattered windshield on the driver side of a car.

Track listing

Maxi-single

Promo CD

Personnel

Soulfly
Max Cavalera – vocals, rhythm guitar, berimbau on track one, talk box on track two
Jackson Bandeira – lead guitar
Marcello D. Rapp – bass
Roy "Rata" Moyorga – drums, percussion

Additional personnel
Fred Durst – vocals on track one
DJ Lethal – scratches on track one
Jorge Du Peixe – percussion on track three
Gilmar Bolla Oito – percussion and triangle on track three
Produced by Ross Robinson

Charts

References 

Soulfly songs
1998 songs
1998 singles
Songs written by Max Cavalera
Songs written by Fred Durst
Roadrunner Records singles
Rap metal songs